The Real Dirty Dancing is an American dance competition television series that aired on Fox from February 1 to 22, 2022. It is an adaptation of the Australian series, and was hosted by Stephen "tWitch" Boss.

Format

Production
On January 19, 2022, it was announced that Fox had ordered the series, with Stephen "tWitch" Boss as the host and Chris Culvenor, Paul Franklin, Wes Dening, Dave Emery and Dan Martin as the executive producers. The names of the celebrities competing were also announced. The series premiered on February 1, 2022. It replaced the previously scheduled debut of Monarch, which was delayed to a fall 2022 launch at the request of The Resident creator Amy Holden Jones.

Contestants

Elimination table

Weeks

Week 1 (February 1)

Best Baby: Cat
Best Johnny: Tyler

Week 2 (February 8)
Jane Brucker served as a guest host.

Best Baby: Cat
Best Johnny: Corbin

Week 3 (February 15)
Allison Holker served as a guest host.

Week 4 (February 22)

Episodes

Reception

Ratings

Notes

References

External links

2020s American reality television series
2022 American television series debuts
2022 American television series endings
American television series based on Australian television series
Dance competition television shows
English-language television shows
Fox Broadcasting Company original programming
Television series by Eureka
Television series by Lionsgate Television